Lockview High School is a high school located in Fall River, Nova Scotia, serving the areas of Fall River, Beaver Bank, Windsor Junction, Waverley, Wellington and a section of Enfield. It opened in 2000, relieving overcrowding at Charles P. Allen High School in Bedford.  The building itself is operated by Scotia Learning Centres and is currently being leased to the Halifax Regional Centre for Education.

The Lockview High team mascot is a blue dragon named Miller. The school is located in Lockview, an area of Fall River along the Shubenacadie Canal.  Other schools in the immediate area include Georges P. Vanier Junior High School and Ash Lee Jefferson Elementary School.

Lockview High receives new students primarily from Georges P. Vanier Junior High School in Fall River and Harold T. Barrett Junior High School in Beaver Bank (located approximately 7 minutes from Lower Sackville, Nova Scotia).  Since Lockview spans grades nine through twelve, both Georges P. Vanier and Harold T. Barrett no longer have grade nine classes and instead, transfer the students to Lockview.  By effectively removing a third of the population from each junior high, Lockview has helped to relieve what was once a severe overpopulation problem in its feeder schools. Lockview has almost 1300 students.

The School/Building 
The "Lockview Overhead Key"

Numbers 

 Main Office 
 D-pod, Downstairs D holds the learning centre and dragon depot (the schools store) among a handful of classrooms, upstairs D holds the mathematics pod 
 Downstairs B-pod holds the science pod, which contains regular classrooms among labs 
 Upstairs B-pod holds the social studies pod 
 Upstairs A-pod is home to the French immersion and core French classes, Downstairs A-pod is the English pod 
 stairwell next to gym 
 Gym 
 Cafeteria/Stage 
 Art Department 
 Music/band room 
 Drama room/Stage 
 Outdoor rec area with concrete bleachers and a handful of basketball hoops
 Attic above the stairwell

Colours 

 Red=Exit
 Blue=Entrance (Purple is main)
 Yellow=Stairwell (Orange is main)
 Green=library
 White= cat walk that travels over cafeteria (access points are stairwell opposite of number six, and backstage)

The Land 

"Birds eye view of LHS"

Numbers 

 The schools football field 
 Staff parking 02
 Student parking
 Bus drop-off and pickup point 
 Staff/Visitor parking 
 See The school/building Number 12

The Blue Circle is a public park/walking trail

The black line is another path surrounding the football field with a fork off to Kinclaven Dr.

References

External links 

Lockview High School
School profile at Halifax Regional School Board

Educational institutions established in 2000
High schools in Halifax, Nova Scotia
Schools in Halifax, Nova Scotia
2000 establishments in Nova Scotia